Luis Ernesto González Mina (born 25 November 1972), is a retired Ecuadorian footballer, he played as a midfielder during his career.

Career
González spent the majority of his professional career with L.D.U. Quito, he also played for Universidad Católica, Aucas, Manta, Imbabura and Talleres. He retired from football after the 2009 season.

International career
Between 1996 and 1999, he earned 13 caps with the Ecuador national team.

Honors
L.D.U. Quito
Serie A: 1998, 1999, 2003, 2005 Apertura
Serie B: 2001

References

External links
 Luis González at National Football Teams

1972 births
Living people
Ecuadorian footballers
Ecuador international footballers
Ecuadorian Serie A players
L.D.U. Quito footballers
C.D. Universidad Católica del Ecuador footballers
S.D. Aucas footballers
Imbabura S.C. footballers
Manta F.C. footballers
Association football midfielders